Carlos Cecilio Estigarribia (born 21 November 1974) is a former Paraguayan footballer playing for clubs in Paraguay and Argentina, as well as for the Paraguay national football team in the 1999 Copa América Paraguay. He played as a midfielder.
He was born in Luque, Paraguay.

Teams
  Fluminense 1998
  Sportivo Luqueño 1999–2000
  Independiente 2000–2001
  Olimpia 2001–2002
  Sportivo Luqueño 2003
  Guaraní 2003
  Olimpia 2004
  12 de Octubre 2004
  General Caballero (Zeballos Cue) 2005
  Rubio Ñu 2006–2007

Titles
  Olimpia 2002 (Copa Libertadores de América)

References

External links
 
 
 

1974 births
Living people
Sportspeople from Luque
Paraguayan footballers
Paraguayan expatriate footballers
Paraguay international footballers
Sportivo Luqueño players
12 de Octubre Football Club players
Club Olimpia footballers
Club Guaraní players
Club Rubio Ñu footballers
General Caballero Sport Club footballers
Club Atlético Independiente footballers
Expatriate footballers in Argentina
1999 Copa América players
Association football midfielders